Erebia euryale, the large ringlet, is a species of butterfly belonging to the family Nymphalidae.

Subspecies
Subspecies include: 
 Erebia euryale adyte Hübner, 1822 (central and southern Alps, Swiss Jura and parts of Abruzzo)
 Erebia euryale etobyma Fruhstorfer, 1910
 Erebia euryale euryale (Esper, 1805) (northern Alps)
 Erebia euryale huebneri Oberthür, 1912
 Erebia euryale isarica Heyne, 1895 (northern Alps, Switzerland, France)
 Erebia euryale ocellaris Staudinger, 1861 (eastern and southern Alps)
 Erebia euryale syrmia Fruhstorfer, 1909 (Balkan Peninsula, Bulgaria, Romania)

Distribution and habitat
This species is endemic to Europe. It can be found in southern Europe, in the Alps, Cantabrian, Pyrenees, Carpathians, Balkans, in northern Europe from Finland to the Urals and in Altai. Erebia euryale is an alpine species.

Description

Erebia euryale has a wingspan of 20–23 mm. These butterflies have a considerable geographic variation. Usually the upperside of the forewings is dark brown with a reddish-orange postmedian band marked with three or four oval ocelli, with white pupils in the females, often blind or reduced to small dots in the males. All wings show chequered fringes. The forewings of the males do not show androconial area. The upperside of each hindwing usually has three eyespots surrounded by orange. The underside hindwings of the females shows a diffuse clear or whitish band, strongly dentate. The caterpillar and the chrysalis are pinkish brown. This species is rather similar to Erebia ligea.

Biology
This species is univoltine. It overwinters a first year as an egg, a second year as a caterpillar. The eggs, pearly grey, hatch in the spring. Adults fly from June to September. They feed at mountain flowers, specially at yellow daisies. Caterpillars feed on various grasses (Anthoxanthum odoratum, Brachypodium sylvaticum, Deschampsia cespitosa, Festuca ovina, Festuca rubra, Festuca alpina, Poa nemoralis, Carex flacca, Digitaria, Milium, Carex and Sesleria species).

Bibliography
A. G. Tatarinov and M. M. Dolgin: To the Knowledge of the Intraspecific Variation of the Satyrid Erebia euryale Esp. (Lepidoptera, Satyridae) in Northeastern European Russia. 
Bolotov I.N. 2012. The Fauna and Ecology of Butterflies (Lepidoptera, Rhopalocera) of the Kanin Peninsula and Kolguev Island. - Entomological Review 92(3): 296-304.
Guide des papillons d'Europe et d'Afrique du Nord de Tom Tolman, Richard Lewington, éditions Delachaux et Niestlé, 1998 -
M.Chinery & P.Leraut Photoguide des papillons d'Europe Delachaux et Niestlé
Thomas Schmitt & Karola Haubrich: The genetic structure of the mountain forest butterfly Erebia euryale unravels the late Pleistocene and postglacial history of the mountain coniferous forest biome in Europe. Molecular Ecology, 17: 2194–2207, 2008 doi:10.1111/j.1365-294X.2007.03687.x

External links

 Papillons de Poitou-Charentes
 Euro Butterflies
 Paolo Mazzei, Daniel Morel, Raniero Panfili Moths and Butterflies of Europe and North Africa
 Butterflies of Bulgaria

References

Erebia
Butterflies of Europe
Butterflies described in 1805